The 1941 Green Bay Packers season was their 23rd season overall and their 21st season in the National Football League. The team finished with a 10–1 record under founder and head coach Curly Lambeau, earning a tie for first place in the Western Conference with the defending league champion Chicago Bears. They split their season series, each winning on the road, and met in a playoff in Chicago to determine who would host the New York Giants in the NFL Championship Game. The Packers lost 33-14  in the first post-season game ever played between the archrivals; the next came over 69 years later, in the NFC Championship game on January 22, 2011.

Offseason

NFL draft

Green indicates a future Pro Football Hall of Fame inductee

Regular season

Schedule

Playoffs

Standings

Roster

Awards and records
Don Hutson, NFL receiving leader, 74 receptions
Cecil Isbell, NFL leader, passing yards (1,479)

Milestones
Don Hutson, 1,000 yard receiving season (1,211 yards)

References

Sportsencyclopedia.com

Green Bay Packers seasons
Green Bay Packers
Green Bay Packers